Apium insulare, Flinders Island celery, or Island celery is a herb of the Bass Strait islands, and Lord Howe Island, Australia. It is a member of the Apiaceae (carrot family.

It was first described by Philip Short in 1979.

Uses
It is considered to be "worth investigating" as a food plant.

Physical Characteristics
The species is hermaphrodite (has both male and female organs). It is suitable for light (sandy), medium (loamy) and heavy (clay) soils. The suitable pH for it to grow acid, neutral and basic (alkaline) soils. It can grow in semi-shade (light woodland) or no shade. It prefers moist soil.

References

External links 
*Apium insulare occurrence data from GBIF

Bushfood
insulare
Apiales of Australia
Flora of Tasmania
Flora of Lord Howe Island
Taxa named by Philip Sydney Short